The red-billed scimitar babbler (Pomatorhinus ochraceiceps) is a species of bird in the family Timaliidae. It is found in Northeast India, Southeast Asia and adjacent parts of southern China.

Its natural habitats are subtropical or tropical moist lowland forest and subtropical or tropical moist montane forest.

References

Collar, N. J. & Robson, C. 2007. Family Timaliidae (Babblers)  pp. 70 – 291 in; del Hoyo, J., Elliott, A. & Christie, D.A. eds. Handbook of the Birds of the World, Vol. 12. Picathartes to Tits and Chickadees. Lynx Edicions, Barcelona.

red-billed scimitar babbler
Birds of Northeast India
Birds of Southeast Asia
red-billed scimitar babbler
Taxonomy articles created by Polbot